Varallo Sesia (Piedmontese: Varal), pronunciation (Vhuh-rahl-loh) commonly known as Varallo, is a comune and town in the province of Vercelli in the Piedmont region of Italy.

Once called Varade, it is divided in two boroughs (Varallo Vecchia and Varallo Nuova) by the Mastallone stream.

In 1971, Varallo was awarded the Golden Medal for Military Valor for the deeds of its population against the German occupation in the late stages of World War II.

Geography
The valley of the Sesia is very narrow at this point as it nears its source. Varallo lies on the left bank where the Mastallone flows into the Sesia.

The town is surrounded by the foothills of the Alps and is not far from the Monte Rosa, which is visible from the surrounding hills.

Main sights

The churches of San Gaudenzio, Santa Maria delle Grazie, and Santa Maria di Loreto, all contain works by Gaudenzio Ferrari, who was born in the neighboring Valduggia.

Museums and galleries include the Pinacoteca Civica (the David and Goliath pictured is by Tanzio da Varallo who was born in the frazione Riale), the Museo Comola in the frazione Camasco, the Museo Scaglia and the Museo di Storia Naturale Calderini.

The environs are composed of winding paths leading past 45 chapel-like enclosures containing groups of life-size painted terra-cotta figures with backgrounds in fresco (by Gaudenzio Ferrari and others). The tableaux represent scenes mainly from the life of Jesus. The array was initiated by a Franciscan, Bernardino Caimi, who aimed to reproduce locally images of the passion as a goal of pilgrims. The main pilgrimage church was built by Pellegrino Tibaldi after 1578. In the works mentioned Ferrari's whole development may be traced.

In the frazione of Arboerio are the old church of Saints Quirico and Giulitta, with a 17th-century polyptych and an altar of the Madonna del Rosario, and the Villa Eremo.

Twin towns — sister cities
Varallo Sesia is twinned with:
  Die, France

See also
Varallo Sesia railway station
Varallo Pombia, a commune in the Province of Novara

References

External links

Official web site for European Sacred Mountains 

 
Cities and towns in Piedmont